Ernests Gulbis was the defending champion but decided to participate in the 2011 Dubai Tennis Championships instead.
Juan Martín del Potro won this tournament, by defeating Janko Tipsarević 6–4, 6–4 in the final.

Seeds

Qualifying

Draw

Finals

Top half

Bottom half

References
 Main draw
 Qualifying draw

Delray Beach International Tennis Championships - Singles
2011 Singles
2011 Delray Beach International Tennis Championships